= Detroit metro =

Detroit metro may refer to:

- Detroit Metropolitan Airport
- Metro Detroit
